Fleur Revell-Devlin (born Fleur Revell, 14 March 1972) is a New Zealand public relations consultant and former television personality and journalist. She won three Qantas Media Awards for excellence in journalism including Junior Feature Writer of the Year (Magazine). She is married to Mark Devlin her co-director of a public relations consultancy.

Early life and education
Fleur Revell-Devlin was born as Fleur Revell on 14 March 1972 in Blenheim, New Zealand. She completed a Bachelor of Arts degree from Victoria University of Wellington and a post-graduate Certificate of Journalism from  Wellington Polytechnic (now Massey University).

Career 
Fleur Revell-Devlin started her journalism career as a social welfare reporter at the Rotorua Daily Post and then police reporter at Auckland's Western Leader. She was later employed as a senior reporter for the Sunday Star-Times and freelance feature writer for The New Zealand Herald.

Revell-Devlin worked as a reporter and producer on TVNZ's ONE News, Sportsnight and Breakfast before becoming a presenter on a number of television shows for both TVNZ and TV3 including Revell with a Cause, Destination Planet Earth, Car Crazy and Who’s House is it Anyway.

Revell-Devlin worked as a staff writer for Next and More magazines, and for nine months as editor at women’s magazine New Idea.

Revell-Devlin is a co-director of a public relations company Impact PR, which she runs with her husband, Mark Devlin.

References 

Living people
1972 births